Xincun Subdistrict is a subdistricts on the eastern Fengtai District, Beijing, China. It borders the following places: Fengtai Subdistrict to the north, Huaxiang Township to the east, south and west, and Wanping Subdistrict to the southwest. It has 204,697 residents as of 2020.

The name of the subdistrict originated in 1957, where a new dorminitory was constructed in the area for local factory workers and their families.

History

Administrative Division 
At the end of 2021, Xincun Subdistrict is divided into 19 subdivisions, with 18 communities and 1 village:

Landmark 

 Dabaotai Western Han Dynasty Mausoleum

See also 

 List of township-level divisions of Beijing

References 

Fengtai District
Subdistricts of Beijing